Sean Stewart (born June 2, 1965) is an American-Canadian science fiction and fantasy author.

Biography 

Born in Lubbock, Texas, Sean Stewart moved to Edmonton, Alberta, Canada in 1968. After stints in Houston, Texas, Vancouver, British Columbia, Irvine, California, Monterey, California Davis, Santa Monica, California, and Pasadena, California, he now again lives in Santa Monica.

He received an Honors degree in English from University of Alberta in 1987, following which he spent many years writing novels. He gradually moved from writing novels to interactive fiction, first as lead writer on the Web-based alternate reality game The Beast.

He served as a consultant on several computer games, and was on the management team of the 42 Entertainment experiential marketing and entertainment company, where he was lead writer for Haunted Apiary aka ilovebees and Last Call Poker. His novel series Cathy's Book (and its sequels) seems to represent the melding of his two careers, as it crosses the alternate reality game format with a teen novel. In 2007, he and several 4orty2wo co-founders left that company to start Fourth Wall Studios, where they won an Emmy for interactive television in 2013. In 2014, he joined Microsoft's Xbox Studios as Creative Director. After Xbox Studios closed in late 2014, Stewart began consulting for Magic Leap, joining them as Creative Director/Design Director in early 2016.

Bibliography
 Passion Play (1992, science fiction novel, winner of the Prix Aurora and Arthur Ellis Awards)
 Nobody's Son (1994, fantasy novel, winner of the Aurora Award)
 Resurrection Man (1995, magic realist fantasy novel, New York Times Best Science Fiction Book of the Year)
 Clouds End (1996, heroic fantasy novel)
 The Night Watch (1997, set in the same world as Resurrection Man)
 Mockingbird (1998, New York Times Notable Book of the Year, World Fantasy Award nominee, Speculations Readers' Poll Best Book of the Year)
 Galveston (2000, World Fantasy Award and Sunburst Award winner, again set in the same world as Resurrection Man)
 Perfect Circle (2004, another magic realist fantasy novel; Nebula nominee; also published under the title Firecracker)
 Yoda: Dark Rendezvous (Star Wars: A Clone Wars Novel) (2004)
 Cathy's Book (2006)
 Cathy's Key (2008)
 Cathy's Ring (2009)

References

External links

 
 
 42 Entertainment, Sean Stewart's former job
 Fourth Wall Studios, co-founded by Stewart
 1999 interview by Locus (locusmag.com) 
 2005 interview by Locus  
 2006 interview on alternate reality gaming at Encyclopedia Hanasiana (hanasiana.com)
 Discussion of Stewart at theforce.net
 2016 article/interview of Sean Stewart  on aescifi.ca
 

American emigrants to Canada
American fantasy writers
American male novelists
American science fiction writers
Canadian fantasy writers
Canadian science fiction writers
World Fantasy Award-winning writers
People from Davis, California
People from Irvine, California
People from Lubbock, Texas
1965 births
Living people
Novelists from California
20th-century American novelists
21st-century American novelists
20th-century Canadian male writers
21st-century Canadian male writers
20th-century American male writers
21st-century American male writers
Transmedia storytelling